Harold Kerzner (born ca 1940) is an American engineer, management consultant, Emeritus Professor of Systems Management at Baldwin Wallace University, and Sr. Executive Director for Project Management at the International Institute for Learning, known for his work in the field of project management.

Biography 
Kerzner received an MS and PhD at the University of Illinois and an MBA at Utah State University.

Kerzner started as an engineer at the Thiokol Corporation, where he worked in program management and project engineering. Later he started his academic career at the University of Illinois teaching engineering, and afterwards at Utah State University teaching business administration.

In the early 1980s, he became Professor of Systems Management at Baldwin-Wallace College, now Baldwin Wallace University.

In 1998, Kerzner received the Distinguished Service Award for his contributions to project management from the Utah State University, and the University of Illinois granted him the Distinguished Recent Alumni Award. The Project Management Institute, the Northeast Ohio Chapter, annually grants the Kerzner Award for excellent achievements in project management to a company or individual.

Dr.Kerzner is currently the Executive Director for International Institute for Learning (IIL)  With the company, he has authored numerous books about Project Management.t

Publications 
Kerzner published numerous papers including textbooks on engineering, business and project management topics. A selection:
 1979. Project management: a systems approach to planning, scheduling, and controlling New York : Van Nostrand Reinhold
 1980. Project Management for Bankers. Van Nostrand Reinhold
 1982. Project management for executives. New York : Van Nostrand Reinhold
 1984. Project Management for the Small and Medium Sized Businesses. With Hans Thamhain. Van Nostrand Reinhold
 1985, Project Management Policy and Strategy. With David Cleland. Van Nostrand Reinhold Publishers
 1985. A project management dictionary of terms. With David I. Cleland. New York : Van Nostrand Reinhold
 1986. Engineering Team Management. With David Cleland. Van Nostrand Reinhold
 1986. Project Management Operating Guidelines. With Hans Thamhain. Van Nostrand Reinhold
 1998. In Search of Excellence in Project Management. Van Nostrand Reinhold
 1999. Project management: strategic design and implementation. With David I. Cleland
 2002. Strategic planning for project management using a project management maturity model
 2009. What Functional Managers Need to Know about Project Management. With Frank P. Saladis
 2009. What Executives Need to Know about Project Management. With Frank P. Saladis
 2009. Value-Driven Project Management. With Frank P. Saladis
 2010. Managing Complex Projects.
 2010. Project Management-Best Practices: Achieving Global Excellence, 2nd Ed.
 2011. Project Management Metrics, KPIs and Dashboards, 1st Edition; 2nd Ed. 2013
 2012. Project management case studies
 2014. Project-Based Problem Solving & Decision Making. With Belack.
 2014. Project Recovery: Case Studies and Techniques for Overcoming Project Failure
2014. Project Management Best Practices, 3rd Ed.
2015. PM 2.0
2017. Project Management: A Systems Approach to Planning, Scheduling and Controlling, 12th Ed.
2017. Project Management Workbook, 12th Ed.
2017. Project Management Case Studies, 5th Ed.
2017. Project Management Metrics, KPIs and Dashboards, 3rd Ed.
2018: Project Management Best Practices, 4th Ed.
2018. Defining Project Management Success with Application to Innovation Project Management Practices
2018. The Future of Project Management
2019. Using the Project Management Maturity Model, 3rd Ed.
2019. Innovation Project Management

Articles, a selection
 1987. "In search of excellence in project management" in: Journal of Systems Management, 1987
 2003. "Strategic planning for a project office" in: Project Management Journal, 2003
2014. "Surviving Disasters in Project Management: An Interview with Dr. Harold Kerzner"

Online Courses
 2018. Future Trends in Project Management - A six part series with Dr. Harold Kerzner

Scholarship Fund and Awards 
The Dr. Harold Kerzner Scholarship Fund This is an endowed scholarship fund provided through the Project Management Institute Educational Foundation and sponsored by The International Institute for Learning.  The Dr. Harold Kerzner Scholarships are four academic scholarships valued at up to US $7,500 with each of the four scholarships being open to all students pursuing undergraduate or graduate degrees in Project Management or related fields of study from accredited, degree-granting colleges and universities. The four scholarships are awarded annually.

The Kerzner Award for Excellence in Project Management - The PMI Educational Foundation administers the prestigious Kerzner Award for excellence in project management.  The Kerzner Award is sponsored by International Institute for Learning, Inc. (IIL) to recognize a project manager who most emulates the professional dedication and excellence of Harold Kerzner, PhD., MS, MBA. In addition to public recognition of his or her professional dedication and excellence, the recipient of the Kerzner Award will receive IIL training valued at US $5,000 and an expense-paid trip to receive the award at the PMI® Global Conference—North America Awards Ceremony in October.

The International ISIPM Award - The Italian Institute of Project Management presented Dr. Kerzner with the 2019 International ISIPM Award for his contributions to the field of Project Management

References

External links 

  Harold Kerzner, Ph.D. at Baldwin Wallace University

1940s births
Living people
21st-century American engineers
University of Illinois alumni
Utah State University alumni
Baldwin Wallace University faculty
University of Illinois faculty
Utah State University faculty